The Greater Chennai Police, a division of the Tamil Nadu Police, is the law enforcement agency for the city of Chennai in India and the surrounding area.  The city police force is headed by a Commissioner of Police and the administrative control vests with the Tamil Nadu Home Department.  There are four sub-divisions of the Greater Chennai Police, and 104 police stations.  The city's traffic is managed by the Greater Chennai Traffic Police. Chennai is the first city in India to introduce e-Beat system used to measure the daily routine and performance of the police personnel.

History 
In 1659, when Chennai (then called Madras) was just a group of fishing villages. Pedda Naik formed a group of peons to guard the town.  By 1780 the post of Superintendent of Police was created to manage the markets. After the Indian Rebellion of 1857, the British Raj in India formed the modern Madras Police as part of its reforms.

The Chennai City Traffic Police is a branch of the  Greater Chennai Police, with the mission of regulating traffic in the city of Chennai. It was established in 1929 when the Police department was split into 3, namely, Law & Order, Crime and Traffic. As of 2011, the government merged Chennai Suburban Police with Chennai city police to form The Greater Chennai Police Commissionerate.

Achievements 

Additional Yellow Brigades & Blue Brigades motorcycles and patrol vehicles have been introduced in Greater Chennai. Each Yellow Brigade covers a distance of 2 km2 approximately during daytime from 6 am to 9 pm. The Blue Brigade covers the same distance of 2 km2 during nighttime from 11 pm to 6.30 am. The patrol vehicles covers an approximate distance of 3.2 km2 each day.  For patrol duty, 40 Jeeps have been provided equipped with police sirens, revolving lights, public address system, fire extinguisher, top search light, police display light and wireless communication system. The response time to control room calls has been brought down to 3–4 minutes. The Tamil Nadu Police claims that the crime rate in the Greater Chennai City has come down considerably after these initiatives.

The police force include 100 Hyundai Accent patrol cars that was donated by the Hyundai Motor Company, whose factory is located in Sriperumbudur, on the outskirts of the city. The cars are fitted with digital cameras, wireless communication devices and loudspeakers, making this the only police force in the country to use sedan patrol cars. Patrol cars have been provided to Greater Chennai Police. Hyundai  donated Accent cars to Chennai Police, of which 75 were given to Law & Order, 21 to traffic department. The remaining 4 cars were incorporated into the Chief Minister's convoy.

Ranks of law enforcement in Chennai Police
The ranks, posts and designations of all police officers vary from state to state as law and order is a state matter. But, generally the following pattern is observed:

Gazetted Officers
.

Non-gazetted officers

List of police stations 
Following are the new list of delimitation police stations within the jurisdiction of Chennai Metropolitan Police.

Footnotes

References

External links 
 Official website

Government of Chennai
Metropolitan law enforcement agencies of India
Tamil Nadu Police
1659 establishments in Asia
17th-century establishments in India